Madobe Nunow Mohamed (1948 — 29 October 2017) is a Somali politician. He was the second president of South West State of Somalia.

Biography 
Madobe Nunow Mohamed was born in 1948 in Dinsoor District in the Bay region of Somalia. He was a long time member of the Somali Parliament and worked with Siad Barre's military government, holding positions in organizations at the time.

Nunow completed his primary and secondary education in the 1960s in Dinsor. In the 1970s he completed his secondary education in the Hawle Wadag District of Mogadishu.

In the late 1970s Madobe Nunow received training at the Halane Training School in Mogadishu, earning a diploma in Political Science from 1979-1980 at the Halane Institute of Political Science in Mogadishu. In 1983—1984, Nunow received his SIDAM Diploma in Administration & Management.

Political career 
From 1966 to 1968 he was a member of the Somali Youth League in Bay.

From 1974 to 1976 he was a clerk in the Ministry of Interior in Bay.

From 1976 to 1978 he was a Head of the Office of the Ministry of Interior in Dinsoor District.

From 1977 to 1978 he was a Head of Social Affairs of SSC in Dinsoor.

From 1980 to 1981 he was a First Assistant to the Somali Revolutionary Socialist Party in Sablale District, Lower Shabelle.

From 1981 to 1983 he was a First Assistant to the Somali Revolutionary Socialist Party in Beled Hawo District, Gedo.

In 1985 Nunow was the Mayor of Dinsoor.

From 1987 to 1990 he was the Secretary of the Somali Revolutionary Socialist Party and the Governor of Adale in the Middle Shabelle.

From 1991 to 1992 he was a Chairman of the Dinsor District Rescue Committee in Bay.

In 1995 Madobe Nunow Mohamed was one of the founders of the Rahanweyn Resistance Army.

From 2001 to 2012 Nunow was a Member of Parliament of Somalia. Nunow served as Somalia's Deputy Minister of Petroleum from 2004 to 2007, Minister of Information from 2007 to 2008, and Minister of Youth and Sports from 2008 to 2009. From 2009 to 2010, Nunow was the Minister of Constitution & Federal Affairs of Somalia, and one year later, from 2011 to 2012 he was the Chairman of the Parliamentary Committee on Constitution and Federal Affairs. From 2012 to 2014 he was a member of the Technical Committee for the Establishment of the South West Administration.

References

External links 

 Madoobe Nuunow Maxamed | Somali Wiki

Presidents of South West State of Somalia
Ethnic Somali people
1948 births
2017 deaths